The Swordsman, also known as Swordsman, is a 1990 Hong Kong wuxia film. King Hu was credited as the director but allegedly left the project midway, and the film was completed by a team led by producer Tsui Hark. The film is loosely adapted from Louis Cha's novel The Smiling, Proud Wanderer. The film was followed by two sequels: Swordsman II (1992) and The East Is Red (1993).

Plot 
The story is set in 16th-century China during the Ming dynasty. Gu Jinfu, a eunuch from the spy agency Eastern Depot, leads a team to retrieve the Sunflower Manual, a martial arts manual stolen from the imperial palace. They track down and attack the thief, Lin Zhennan. Around this time, Linghu Chong and Yue Lingshan, members of the Mount Hua School, encounter Lin Zhennan and save him. Before succumbing to his wounds, Lin Zhennan tells them to tell his son, Lin Pingzhi, where he had hidden the manual.

While making their way to rendezvous with their Mount Hua School fellows, Linghu Chong and Yue Lingshan chance upon Liu Zhengfeng and Qu Yang, who are planning to retire from the jianghu (martial artists' community). Just then, Zuo Lengshan, who works for Eastern Depot, shows up with his men and tries to arrest Liu Zhengfeng and Qu Yang. Linghu Chong and the others manage to escape, but Liu Zhengfeng and Qu Yang are seriously wounded in the process. Before committing suicide, the duo perform "Xiaoao Jianghu", a musical piece they composed together, and pass their instruments and the score to Linghu Chong.

Linghu Chong encounters the reclusive swordsman Feng Qingyang and learns the skill Nine Swords of Dugu from him. He also finds out that his gentlemanly master, Yue Buqun, is actually a power-hungry hypocrite. In the meantime, Gu Jinfu's henchman, Ouyang Quan, impersonates the dead Lin Pingzhi and infiltrates the Mount Hua School. He tricks Linghu Chong into revealing the whereabouts of the Sunflower Manual and then poisons him. Linghu Chong is saved by Ren Yingying and Lan Fenghuang of the Sun Moon Holy Cult. They combine forces to defeat and kill Zuo Lengshan and his men.

Around the same time, Yue Buqun, Ouyang Quan, Gu Jinfu and the others have arrived at the location where the Sunflower Manual is hidden and are fighting over the manual. Linghu Chong shows up, kills Gu Jinfu, exposes Yue Buqun's treachery and defeats him. He decides to spend the rest of his life roaming the jianghu with his friends.

Cast 
 Sam Hui as Linghu Chong
 Cecilia Yip as Yue Lingshan
 Jacky Cheung as Ouyang Quan
 Sharla Cheung as Ren Yingying
 Fennie Yuen as Lan Fenghuang
 Lau Siu-ming as Yue Buqun
 Wu Ma as Liu Zhengfeng (guest appearance)
 Lam Ching-ying as Qu Yang (guest appearance)
 Yuen Wah as Zuo Lengshan (guest appearance)
 Lau Shun as Gu Jinfu (guest appearance)
 Cheung Ming-man as Lu Dayou (guest appearance)
 Kam Shan as Lin Zhennan
 Han Ying-chieh as Feng Qingyang (guest appearance and final performance)

Music 
The theme song of the film, "Chong Hoi Yat Sing Siu" (滄海一聲笑; "A Sound of Laughter in the Vast Sea"), was composed by James Wong, who also wrote its lyrics, and performed in Cantonese by Sam Hui.

Box office 
The film grossed HK$16,052,552 at the Hong Kong box office.

Reception 
The Swordsman currently holds a 73% rating on Rotten Tomatoes.

Andrew Saroch of Far East Films writes that

Awards and nominations

References

External links 
 
 
 

1990 films
1990 action films
1990 martial arts films
1990s Cantonese-language films
Films based on Chinese novels
Films based on works by Jin Yong
Films directed by Ann Hui
Films directed by Ching Siu-tung
Films directed by King Hu
Hong Kong action films
Hong Kong martial arts films
Mandarin-language films
Works based on The Smiling, Proud Wanderer
Wuxia films
1990s Hong Kong films